Fortunate Son is a Canadian espionage drama television series, which premiered January 8, 2020 on CBC Television. The show is loosely based on the experiences of Mary Cox, the mother of co-executive producer Tom Cox, who helped American draft dodgers cross the border into Canada during the Vietnam War.

The show takes its name from the 1969 Creedence Clearwater Revival protest song "Fortunate Son".

Premise
Set in 1968, the show centres on Ruby Howard, an American expatriate living in British Columbia with her family involved in antiwar activism who is asked to help troubled American Travis Hunter cross the border into Canada in order to dodge the Vietnam War draft. Meanwhile, CIA handler Vern Lang is setting up a complex operation in order to infiltrate the peace movements on both the American and Canadian sides of the border in an effort to stop draft evasion.

Cast
Kari Matchett as Ruby Howard, an American expat antiwar activist
Stephen Moyer as Vern Lang, a CIA handler
Darren Mann as Travis Hunter, an American draft-dodger
Rick Roberts as Ted, Ruby's husband
Kacey Rohl as Ellen, Ruby's daughter
Alex Nachi as Ralph, Ruby's son
Patrick Gallagher
Ty Olsson
Zoé De Grand Maison

Production
The show was co-produced with Lark Productions in Vancouver, which is backed by NBCUniversal, and Seven24Films, to be aired on the CBC. Executive producers included Wreggitt, Tom Cox, Jordy Randall and Erin Haskett, with Brian Dennis producing. Stefan Schwartz and Ken Girotti directed. Andrew Wreggit was executive producer and showrunner, also stating the show's inspiration came from the childhood of Tom Cox and helping draft dodgers cross the American border in the late 1960s. The drama is "inspired" by a true story. In the story, Ruby Howard is loosely based on Mary Cox, the mother of Tom Cox, a producer at Seven24 Films. Cox stressed the TV series was fictional. Cox's family lived in California in the mid-1960s, and when his brother turned 18 in 1965, their mother decided to move the family to Canada. Cox has related that a CIA operative was planted in his family to spy on his parents for their activism.
 
Moyer and Matchett were announced as co-stars in July 2019. It filmed some locations in southern Alberta. In July 2019, the production took over a main street in Drumheller during its first days of the shoot, setting up vintage cars and extras with 1960s fashion. Drumheller, Tsuu T’ina reserve, Calgary and High River were used as replacement locations for British Columbia.

The soundtrack includes music by bands such as Creedence Clearwater Revival.

Episodes

References

External links

CBC Television original programming
2020 Canadian television series debuts
2020s Canadian drama television series
Television series by Universal Television
Television shows set in British Columbia
Television shows filmed in Calgary
Vietnam War in popular culture